Erepta is a genus of air-breathing land snails, a terrestrial pulmonate gastropod mollusks in the family Helicarionidae.

Species 
Species in the genus Erepta include:
 Erepta mutans
 Erepta nevilli
 Erepta chloritiformis Griffiths & Florens, 2004
 Erepta odontina (Morelet, 1851)
 Erepta pyramidalis Griffiths & Florens, 2004
 Erepta setiliris (Benson, 1859)
 Erepta stylodon (Pfeiffer, 1842)
 Erepta thiriouxi (Germain, 1918)
 Erepta wendystrahmi Grifiths, 2000

References

Helicarionidae
Taxonomy articles created by Polbot